A resident representative is the head of a United Nations agency (such as UNDP, UNICEF, WHO) in a given country. As such, the resident representative has the same rank as an ambassador of a foreign state accredited to that country, under the Convention on the Privileges and Immunities of the United Nations.

References

Diplomats by role
United Nations legislation
United Nations posts